Claude Emerson Welch (March 14, 1906 – March 9, 1996) was an American surgeon who was internationally recognized, and whose career spanned forty years. For most of those forty years, Welch worked at Massachusetts General Hospital. He was involved with a variety of activities that included "patient care, teaching, clinical research, establishment of funds to maintain such activities, promotion of all aspects of medical education, and strengthening of ties between the government, the courts, the legal profession and physicians."

Known as a "bold and skillful surgeon in the abdomen," Welch performed anywhere between 15,000 and 20,000 procedures by the age of 75. He served as president in 8 of the 20 medical associations to which he belonged, wrote more than 200 articles and chapters, authored or edited six books, including his own autobiography, developed a safe technique for performing a duodenostomy, and was one of only six physicians summoned to Rome to consult about the treatment of Pope John Paul II when he was shot in 1981.

While there is no doubt about his skill with a scalpel, he set himself apart from other surgeons by establishing and maintaining a superb rapport with his patients – something he considered essential to good patient care. Beyond the operating room, Welch fought for racial equality at the American Medical Association (AMA) and to establish standards for American Medical Practice. Welch considered these items among some of the most important things he did.

 "His intelligence, diligence, attention to detail, restraint leavened with generosity, caring and a touch of humor brought him the trust of his peers and a succession of assignments, the summation of which truly characterizes him as one of the great surgical statesmen America has produced."

The early years
Claude E. Welch was the eldest child of John and Lettie Phelan Welch. He was born on March 14, 1906, in the town of Stanton, Nebraska. From a very young age, Welch showed great intellectual promise, advancing through the first three grades in the city school in a mere three months. He attributed his rapid advancement to the excellent preschool education he received at home.

By the age of 12, he was working in a local drugstore helping to distribute prescriptions. While the pay was not great, he claimed that he was more than adequately compensated by the amount of candy and ice cream he was able to eat. He continued to work at DeWitt and Drewelow's Drugstore during and after high school. About a year after graduating high school, Welch determined it was time to go to college.

The college years
After considering his options, Welch departed for Doane College in 1923. He believed that although Doane was small, it had many fine professors and offered a wide variety of courses. Wanting to take advantage of this, he took as many courses as possible from a wide spectrum of disciplines including astronomy and English – all while fulfilling the requirements of chemistry major. In addition to his class work, Welch also took on the responsibility of being editor of the student paper. Furthermore, he joined the glee club and participated in a number of sports. His wide participation in a variety of sports could be linked to one of his greatest ambitions at the time. His ambition was to earn an "Honor D" – a letter given to athletes to place on their sweaters for athletic accomplishment. Although Welch was not immediately successful, he was not deterred. In his last semester, he went out for Tennis where he won enough matches to reach the semifinals. This earned him his "Honor D."

Two months before graduation, Welch decided that he would rather go into the medical field than work in a laboratory as a chemist. Following a conversation with his uncle Joseph N. Welch, he determined that Harvard Medical School (HMS) would be the right school for him. Before he entered medical school, however, Welch not only had to fulfill some premedical requirements, but he wanted to earn his master's in chemistry. After making arrangements with the Dean of Harvard Medical School, he enrolled at Columbia University where he fulfilled his premedical requirements over the summer. When the summer was over, he left Columbia University and enrolled in the University of Missouri. It was here he would earn his master's in chemistry.

While at the University of Missouri, he completed the required classes, wrote his thesis on a new diketopiperazine compound that he had discovered, and worked as a professor in the chemistry department. He earned this degree in a year and a summer instead of the standard two years. The time he spent in the laboratory at the university was invaluable for Welch because it confirmed that a life in medicine – rather than a life the laboratory – was the right life for him. This is because he much preferred the human contact medicine provided over the silence that sometimes ran supreme in the laboratory.

Welch began medical school in 1928. Harvard Medical School was everything that it promised to be. From the very first week, he was introduced to world-famous physicians. He used the opportunity to learn from individuals who were at the top of their respective fields. It was in these first few weeks that he was introduced to a person who would become one of the most important mentors in his life, Dr. Arthur Allen.

The first year at medical school was filled with memorization and dissections, but by the second year he was out in the field. He had his first internship during his second year at Boston City Hospital. It was here that he was introduced to surgery. In his third year, he worked as a resident at Huntington Hospital. In his fourth year, he went back to Boston City Hospital.

Welch graduated from HMS in the midst of the Great Depression. Times were not easy, but the class of 1932 recognized the superb education that they had received from Harvard and were determined to make the most of it.

Welch had earned his bachelor's and master's degrees – plus completed his premedical requirements—in five years. He had graduated magna cum laude from HMS in four years. Furthermore, he had achieved all of this while working in drugstores and cafeterias in order to pay for his education.

The years as an intern
Following medical school, Welch began an internship at Massachusetts General Hospital (the MGH). As an intern, Welch was able to observe and work with eminent surgeons. At the end of his internship, Welch became an assistant resident of the East Service. As an assistant resident of the East Service, he worked with Dr. Arthur Allen. This marked the beginning of their mentor-mentee relationship. Following the end of his residency, Allen offered Welch a five-year position as his assistant.

It is funny to note, that Welch was not certified to practice surgery until 1939 – a full seven years after he graduated medical school. This is because the American Board of Surgery did not come into existence until 1937. Welch was actually only the 101st surgeon to be certified by this board. Prior to the 1930s, there had been little oversight of the medical community, but that began to change as the 20th century progressed. Indeed, the requirement for certification was only the beginning. Many more regulations would come some of which Welch would have a role in forming.

Home life
In 1933, Welch met the person who would become the love of his life – Phyllis Paton. They met at the Massachusetts General Hospital where she was working as a student nurse. Although fraternization between residents and student nurses was forbidden, Paton and Welch decided to follow their hearts. Luckily their relationship resulted it only one minor reprimand for her from the understanding director of the school of nursing.

Paton had originally wanted to attend Smith College and study to become a doctor. But her father became severely ill and she decided to enter the Massachusetts General Hospital School of Nursing instead. Another factor that potentially played a role in Paton's decision was the fact that it was in the middle of the Great Depression and nursing school was significantly cheaper than Smith College – even with a scholarship.

After graduating from the Massachusetts General Hospital School of Nursing in 1936, Paton returned to her native Montreal and enrolled in McGill University. After obtaining her degree from McGill, she had intended to attend McGill University Medical School. But life – and Welch – had other plans. Welch and Paton were married on August 14, 1937.

Their honeymoon around the Gaspe Peninsula and the Maine woods was the first of many trips the two would take together. Paton – now Mrs. Welch – and Welch would travel across the globe and make friends everywhere they went. They believed that discovering new geographic areas was one of life's joys.

Following their honeymoon, Welch began his position as Dr. Allen's assistant. The days began at 6:00 am and did not end until well into the night. Nonetheless, "every moment was a delight because [he] learned how to become not only a better surgeon, but a humane physician." 
	
This was particularly important for Welch as he believed that caring for the person was as important as caring for the disease that ailed them. Welch often went well above and beyond for his patients. Welch's commitment was obvious early on. In his first year as a resident under Dr. Allen, he and his wife gave small gifts to all of his patients on Christmas. Seeing how much this was appreciated, they continued the practice year after year.

Claude E. Welch died on March 9, 1996. He was survived by his wife Phyllis; their two sons, Claude E. Welch Jr., professor emeritus of political science at University at Buffalo and John Paton Welch, a retired surgeon, of Hartford, Connecticut; and seven grandchildren.

Life at war
On May 15, 1942, Welch joined the United States Army Medical Corps as a captain. He left behind one son (Claude E. Welch Jr. born June 12, 1939) and a pregnant wife, as well as his job at the Massachusetts General Hospital. He felt that this was a necessary sacrifice in order to serve his country in its time of need. He departed Boston with 123 other surgeons, physicians, and nurses from the Massachusetts General Hospital to Camp Blanding, Florida for training. Together they helped to constitute the 6th General Hospital.

In January 1943, the 6th General Hospital was deployed to North Africa. While there, he and his colleagues discovered that many lessons learned in previous conflicts could not be applied. This was because some medical treatments used in prior conflicts were simply not effective for the different situations that World War II presented. For example:

	"A lesson taught from World War I was that abdominal injuries should be treated by emergency laparotomy. General Ogilvie, in charge of the British Armed Forces based in the eastern desert of North Africa, found that his wounded patients had to be transported by ambulance or truck for long distances after emergency operations. Under those conditions, wounds of the colon that had been closed by suture did very poorly. Colostomies were ordered for all colon wounds. This practice proved to be a very important advance, although we now know that wounds in civilian life can be treated far differently."

In the spring of 1943, Welch was assigned to one of the general hospitals close to the front lines in Rome. At this hospital, there were often more than 150 surgeries a day.

Welch stayed at the front lines until the war ended in 1945. His service in World War II was a significant part of his life for not only did he learn many important medical lessons, but he formed friendships that would last a lifetime. In his autobiography, he summarized the impact of the war using a quote from Colonel Washburn:

"Horrible as War is, there are by-products of value. Lifetime friendships are formed. Men who have campaigned together know one another thoroughly. Fine traits of character are brought out, and in contrast the less admirable ones fail of concealment. Men learn the relative importance of things. A man who has parted from his home and risked his life has learned the comparative unimportance’s of social position and riches. He values accomplishment, service to others, his home life, his chance to raise a family in comfort and security."

While serving in the army, he rose to the rank of lieutenant colonel.

Life as a surgeon
After the war, Welch returned to the Massachusetts Hospital Hospital. The Massachusetts General Hospital was (and still is) one of the nation's finest hospitals and Welch would help pave the path for surgical advancements there during the second phase of his career. Two of the more important developments in surgery advanced by Welch included the development of a safe method of performing a catheter duodenostomy and performing the first replacement of an artery with a vein graft at Massachusetts General Hospital.

In the early 20th century, performing a duodenostomy was considered very unsafe. Indeed, one surgeon who had attempted to perform the operation had a 100 percent death rate. Welch studied notes from the surgeon and determined that he had used "so large a drainage tube that an enormous duodenal fistula resulted through the tube and the patients died of electrolyte imbalance." So when a patient of his in the late 1930s presented an inflamed duodenum and there was a no choice but to remove two-thirds of the stomach, Welch used a new method which he had been developing. He used a catheter to close the duodenal stump. The operation was a success. Following his success, he made an effort to find out if any similar procedures had been used by surgeons.  After discovering two other surgeons who had used a similar technique, Welch reported this new method of performing a duodenostomy to the Journal of the American Medical Association (JAMA) in 1949.

In the early 1940s, the only acceptable way to treat a severed artery was ligation. The hope was that this would prevent gangrene – although it rarely did. After seeing the results of a failed ligation, Welch vowed to try something different. An opportunity presented itself when a man was brought in with a dislocated knee and damaged popliteal artery. Welch performed an artery graft and the leg immediately regained life.

As a surgeon, not only did Welch perform remarkable surgeries, but he had the opportunity to work on remarkable individuals. One of his more famous patients was a geologist who came in with a rare form of intestinal malrotation. Welch successfully fixed the rotation and sent the man on to a successful recovery. This man was Harrison Schmitt who later became both the first scientist to walk on the moon and a US senator from his home state.

Perhaps his most famous patient however was Pope John Paul II. On May 13, 1981, the Pope was shot twice. Three days later, Welch was called to consult with the other physicians and surgeons on the Pope's care. He was one of only six physicians summoned to Rome to consult about the treatment of the Pope. Some time after his return to Boston, he received a thank you letter from Pope John Paul II. This letter was one of his most prized possessions.

Academic ties
Given Massachusetts General Hospital's close ties with Harvard Medical School – and Welch's own ties with the institution – it was only natural that he would want to continue to be involved with HMS. This involvement included teaching responsibilities and serving on various school committees. One committee – of which he was the chairman of – was dedicated to the examination of continuing medical education. In his role as chairman, he helped to institute postgraduate courses at the Massachusetts General Hospital in cancer and gastrointestinal surgery. This was done in accordance with the appeal to make medical education a lifetime adventure. Welch took his responsibilities at Harvard Medical School very seriously and indeed "viewed his contributions to education as second only to his role in improving patient care."

In addition to his work at HMS, Welch published articles in the New England Journal of Medicine. These articles included surveys of recent developments in abdominal surgery. These surveys had originally started with Dr. Allen, but Welch picked them up as Dr. Allen's health began to deteriorate in the 1950s. These articles were just the tip of the iceberg so to speak, for in addition to these surveys, Welch contributed many articles on abdominal surgery, cancer surgery, medical ethics, and thoughts on malpractice. Welch was eventually made a member of the Committee of Publications of the Massachusetts Medical Society (MMS) in 1962. He became chairman in 1969 and served until 1980.

Involvement with medical associations
In 1965, Welch accepted the post of president of the Massachusetts Medical Society (MMS). The acceptance of this post corresponded with the rise of the relationship between medicine and politics. As president of the MMS, he witnessed the types of challenges that would erupt as a result of this new relationship. He also saw the beginnings of malpractice suits. These problems had not come front and center yet though as physicians at the time were still relatively independent.

The same year that he was elected president of the MMS, Welch was elected to serve as a delegate from the state of Massachusetts at the American Medical Association (AMA). This was the first time he had dealt with the AMA on a national level. Prior to that, he had only been on its Residency Review Committee for Surgery. Welch served in the House as a delegate for a decade. During this time, the AMA was confronted with the problem of racism. Technically racial equality existed within the AMA, but it was in name only. In 1968, the Massachusetts delegation, of which Welch was a chairman, prepared a resolution for the Reference Committee. It called for any state association in violation of existing AMA rules (i.e. racial equality) to be expelled from the AMA. This provoked quite a debate on the floor. Welch only added fuel to the fire when he spoke after the resolution was presented. He ended his speech with the following declaration: "It is our contention that this council and House must have such power whenever any action is so fundamental that it involves guarantees extended by the Constitution of the United States." The resolution was adopted and approved at the next meeting.

In 1975, Welch ran to be president of the AMA. Despite his campaign, he lost to Carl Hoffman – the favored candidate of the race. Hoffman not only was from a smaller, less liberal state than Massachusetts (West Virginia), but had served as secretary of the board of trustees at the AMA. During his bid, Welch pressed for "professional standards review organizations" and chaired an AMA committee that drew up "model criteria for patient care."

Despite his failed bid, Welch was one of the two nominees to receive the Distinguished Service Award of the AMA in 1977. This was the highest honor conferred by the organization. Indeed, Welch was one of the few surgeons who had received it at that point.
 
In addition to the AMA, Welch was also a part of the American College of Surgeons – one of the largest and most influential national surgical colleges in the world. Welch's involvement with the ACS began in 1939. His decision to join at the time was due in no small part to his mentor Dr. Arthur Allen's devotion to the organization.

Welch's own involvement in the ACS did not extend beyond attending annual meetings and presenting papers until 1960. His involvement with it ran parallel to his involvement with the AMA. This presented Welch with a variety of challenges as there were strong tensions between the ACS and AMA at the time. Some of these tensions were a result of the thought that the AMA supported primary care over medical and surgical specialties. In 1973, he was elected president of the American College of Surgeons.

Shortly following his presidency of the ACS – and his failed bid for presidency at the AMA – Welch was elected president of the American Surgical Association (ASA). The ASA – which had started as an offshoot of the AMA – is the most prestigious surgical association in America.

During his term in office, two important issues arose. One issue was the allegations made by the Federal Trade Commission (FTC) that the ASA (and other professional organizations) were restraining trade by publishing lists of suggested charges for medical procedures. The ASA stood up for its actions and submitted the required documentation to the FTC. The FTC did not find any violations of free trade and thus declared the ASA innocent of any such charges. The second issue arose in the form of malpractice suits. This issue had been growing over the past decades, but came to the front in the 1970s. Many questions arose as a result of the growth. How were individuals who brought suits going to be fairly and equitably compensated?  One option Welch helped the industry explore was a variant of no-fault insurance. This option listed problems that could occur in surgery and a list of suggested compensations should any of these problems arise. The American Bar Association refused to endorse such a method.

As he was acting as president of the ASA, Welch simultaneously fulfilled his duties as chairman on the new Massachusetts Board of Registration and Discipline in Medicine for the state of Massachusetts. During his time as chairman, the board ruled that "physician’s could not refuse to treat welfare patients just because they were on Medicaid, that women were entitled to full information about the alternative treatments for breast cancer, and that continuing medical education be required for licensure." In addition to creating new safety regulations and punishing those physicians that did not follow these regulations, the Board also forged important bonds between the medical community and the government.

These bonds were partly the result of the fact that doctors whose licenses were being taken away were often the ones being brought forward before the courts for medical malpractice. And while physicians often complained that the public was litigious, clear instances existed where the patient deserved to be compensated. What Welch, and others were concerned about however, were the large – sometimes arbitrary – settlements that patients received which cause a huge burden for physicians in the form of malpractice insurance. That is why Welch helped to design a list of twenty compensable events while he was president of the ASA. It was thought that this would bring more equality and predictability to the system and save millions in court fees and such.

Publications
Welch wrote more than 200 articles and chapters, and he authored or edited six books. Topics include breast cancer, subtotal gastroenterology for duodenal ulcer, prophylactic surgery for colorectal cancer, history of Canadian surgery, diverticulitis of the colon, resectability and survival in stomach cancer, and guidelines for continuum of care. In addition to his research, Welch addressed social issues and the future of the medical profession. He discussed diverse topics such as quality of care, teaching of surgery in medical schools, and the surgical fee system.

Published books include Intestinal Obstruction, Surgery of the Stomach & Duodenum  also published in Spanish, Polypoid Lesions of the Gastrointestinal Tract,  and Manual of Lower Gastrointestinal Surgery  co-authored with his son John P. Welch and Leslie W. Ottinger and also published in German. Claude Welch's final book was titled A Twentieth Century Surgeon: My Life in the Massachusetts General Hospital.  These titles highlight not only Welch's awareness and knowledge of the broad aspects surrounding GI and oncologic surgery, but also of medical economics and organizations.

Life as a senior physician
As Welch's reputation as a caring physician and daring crusader for equal rights grew, he began to win recognition for his achievements. Awards he received included:

The Distinguished Service Award from the AMA in 1979, which honors contributions to the achievement of the ideals of American medicine by aid and cooperation in the advancement of medical science, medical education, or medical care.
The Bigelow Medal Award from the Boston Surgical Society in 1986, which honors achievement in general surgery.
The Trustees Medal Award by the MGH in 1991, which "honors those American physicians and scientists whose lifetime contributions have uniquely benefited humankind, particularly through the advancement of medical care and practice."

In 1992, Welch released his autobiography detailing his life. This autobiography was more than just a reflection of his life – it was a reflection on the changes that had occurred in medicine and surgery throughout the 20th century. A review by William Longmire and H. Kim Lyerly put it succinctly: "Claude has recorded not only a sketch of Boston and the Massachusetts General Hospital and Staff, but a much broader chronicle of 20th century medicine and contemporary thought; as well as a glimpse of life during this period, with penetrating comments on current health care problems as viewed through the eyes of a most thoughtful, experience, and observant scribe"

His legacy includes the Claude E. Welch Research and Education Fund, the endowed Claude E. Welch fellowship for residents to spend time in research, the Claude E. Welch Chair of surgery at Harvard Medical School, and thousands of grateful patients.

References

1906 births
1996 deaths
20th-century American physicians
20th-century surgeons
American surgeons
Doane University alumni
Harvard Medical School alumni
Physicians of Massachusetts General Hospital
People from Stanton County, Nebraska
United States Army Medical Corps officers
United States Army personnel of World War II